The Tinopolis Group is an international TV production and distribution group with businesses based in the UK and US.  It produces over 4,500 hours of television annually for more than 200 UK and foreign broadcasters.

History
Llanelli, Wales, became such a significant regional producer of tin that it was referred to as "Tinopolis" by the latter half of the 19th century.
Hence the parent company took this name when it was established there in 1990. 

Tinopolis purchased  The Television Corporation, the parent company of Sunset + Vine and Mentorn, in 2006.

Video Arts, the training media company, was founded in 1972 by comic John Cleese, and since trained about 100,000 organisations in approximately 50 countries.
Video Arts was purchased by Tinopolis in 2007.

In 1988, writer and director Ed Thomas founded Fiction Factory, a company now part of Tinopolis.
Shares of Tinopolis plc were listed on London's Alternative Investment Market in 2005.
It was widely held by major institutions and purchased in 2008 for £44.7 million by management and private equity company Vitruvian Partners, taking the company private again.

In late 2009 Tinopolis acquired Pioneer Productions, the leading factual producer.

During 2011 Tinopolis expanded its operations overseas through the acquisition of A Smith & Co Productions in June 2011 and BASE Productions in August 2011

In 2014, Tinopolis acquired American non-scripted producer Magical Elves, producer of Top Chef.

The management of Tinopolis bought out their long standing investor Vitruvian Partners in October 2017.

Operations
Tinopolis has production centres in London, Los Angeles, Llanelli, Glasgow and Cardiff.

See also
Media in Wales

References

External links
Tinopolis – group website
Daybreak Pictures
Sunset + Vine

 
1990 establishments in Wales
British companies established in 1990
Mass media companies established in 1990
Mass media companies of Wales
Television in Wales
Television production companies of the United Kingdom
Companies listed on the Alternative Investment Market
Privately held companies of Wales
Companies based in Carmarthenshire